is  the former head coach of the Tokyo Cinq Reves in the Japanese B.League.

Head coaching record

|- 
| style="text-align:left;"|Tokyo Cinq Reves
| style="text-align:left;"|2015-16
| 52||5||47|||| style="text-align:center;"|12th in Eastern|||-||-||-||
| style="text-align:center;"|-
|-
| style="text-align:left;"|Tokyo Cinq Reves
| style="text-align:left;"|2016-17
| 42||14||28|||| style="text-align:center;"|5th in B3|||10||4||6||
| style="text-align:center;"|4th in Final stage
|-

References

1965 births
Living people

Japanese basketball coaches
Tokyo Cinq Rêves coaches